Fabio Volo, pseudonym of Fabio Bonetti, (born 23 June 1972) is an Italian writer, actor, radio and television presenter, screenwriter, drummer, singer and philosopher.

Altezza 1,81 almeno così dice

Career 
Fabio Bonetti was born in Calcinate, Italy on 23 June 1972. After attending middle school, he worked in his father's bakery (which is now an ice-cream shop in Brescia) and did other casual jobs (like modeling and nightlife related). 
In 1996 he became a leading figure at Radio Capital, an Italian radio station. As from 1998, he anchored three edition of the TV program Le Iene.

In 2000 he began to anchor his own radio broadcast "Il volo del mattino" on Radio Deejay and he published his first book entitled "Esco a fare due passi". This was followed by "È una vita che ti aspetto", "Un posto nel mondo", "Il giorno in più", "Il tempo che vorrei", "Le prime luci del mattino" and "La strada verso casa".

In 2002 he debuted as an actor in Alessandro D'Alatri's movie "Casomai". He was nominated for Best Actor at the David di Donatello for his role in this film. In 2006 and 2008 Fabio Volo anchored "Italo Spagnolo" and "Italo Americano" on MTV. In 2010 he won the "Premio Letterario la Tore Isola d'Elba", an ingenuity and excellence award. In 2011, Volo starred in "Il giorno in più", the movie based on his eponymous book. In 2012 he returned in television with "Volo in diretta" on Rai 3.

Internationally, Volo has served as the voice of Po in the Italian version of the Kung Fu Panda film series.

Filmography

Films

Television

Books 
With his novels he has sold over 5 million copies in Italy alone. As of 2019, he has written ten books:

 Esco a fare due passi (2001)
 È una vita che ti aspetto (2003)
 Un posto nel mondo (2006)
 Il giorno in più (2007)
 Il tempo che vorrei (2009)
 Le prime luci del mattino (2011)
 La strada verso casa (2013)
 È tutta vita (2015)
 Quando tutto inizia (2017)
 Una Gran Voglia di Vivere (2019)

References

External links 

1972 births
Living people
Italian male film actors
Italian male television actors
Italian television presenters
Italian male screenwriters
Actors from Bergamo
21st-century Italian novelists
21st-century Italian screenwriters
Writers from Bergamo